Aka Anderson Banvo Amon (born 4 February 1994) is a professional footballer who plays as a forward for Championnat National 2 club Les Herbiers. Born in France, he is a former Ivory Coast youth international.

Club career
Having progressed through his youth career at Paris Saint-Germain and scored 27 goals for the reserve side, Banvo was released by the club and then went on trial at Blackpool. Blackpool soon became keen on signing Banvo. Banvo signed with Blackpool in August 2012. Upon the move, Banvo was given number twenty-nine shirt for the club. Blackpool opted to take up their option of a contract extension that would ensure Banvo remained under contract for the 2013–14 season.

Banvo was loaned out to Stevenage, lying in last place in League One, on 27 March 2014. He made his debut in the Football League two days later, coming on as an 80th-minute substitute for Filipe Morais in a 1–1 draw with Port Vale at Broadhall Way. After making his only appearance at Stevenage, it announced that Banvo was released by the club after they decided not to offer a new contract.

On 4 February 2015, Banvo signed with Bulgarian side Vereya.

After spells at Paris FC II, Boulogne, Martigues, Drancy, and then a return to Martigues, Banvo signed for Annecy on 30 May 2020, who were just promoted to the Championnat National, France's third division. In 2021, he signed for Championnat National 2 side Les Herbiers.

Career statistics

References

External links
 

1994 births
Living people
Citizens of Ivory Coast through descent
Ivorian footballers
Association football forwards
Ivory Coast youth international footballers
Ivorian expatriate footballers
Ivorian expatriate sportspeople in England
Expatriate footballers in England
Ivorian expatriate sportspeople in Bulgaria
Expatriate footballers in Bulgaria
French footballers
French sportspeople of Ivorian descent
Blackpool F.C. players
Stevenage F.C. players
FC Vereya players
US Boulogne players
FC Martigues players
JA Drancy players
FC Annecy players
Les Herbiers VF players
English Football League players
Championnat National players
Championnat National 2 players
Championnat National 3 players